The Tudor myth is the tradition in English history, historiography and literature that presents the period of the 15th century, including the Wars of the Roses, in England as a dark age of anarchy and bloodshed. It served the political purpose of promoting the Tudor period of the 16th century as a golden age of peace, law, order, and prosperity.

Shakespeare's Richard II
There is a passage in Shakespeare’s play, Richard II, that is often pointed to as an expression of the Tudor myth.  It is a speech by the character Carlisle, spoken just as Bolingbroke suggests that he will ascend the throne of England. Carlisle raises his voice to object, and ends with a vision of the future that seems to prophesy the civil wars that are the basis of Shakespeare’s English history plays:

Traditions in the histories of Richard III
Conspicuous in this tradition of history writing and literature was the portrayal of Richard III of England (1452–1485; reigned, 1483–1485) as a deformed hunchback and murderer. One of the historians who founded this tradition was Thomas More, who wrote a history of Richard III. William Shakespeare continued in this tradition through his history plays that covered the 15th century:  Richard II, Henry IV, Part 1, Henry IV, Part 2, Henry V, Henry VI, Part 1, Henry VI, Part 2, Henry VI, Part 3, and Richard III. This tradition dominated the writing of British/Commonwealth-American history up until the twentieth century. However, Horace Walpole and Sir George Buck contradicted this dominant school of historiography during the seventeenth and eighteenth centuries.

The revisionist historian Paul Murray Kendall, author of Richard III (1956), among others, was instrumental in drawing the attention of fellow historians to the distortions of this tradition.

The concept of Merry England takes the opposite view of this period. More specifically, Ricardian historians, the Richard III Society and The Society of Friends of King Richard III have striven to provide historical perspectives more favourable to Richard III and his achievements during his brief reign.

Sources of the Tudor myth 
 The Anglica Historia of Polydore Vergil,  Books 23–25 on Richard III.;  Entire 1555 edition (Henry VII's official historian). First in print in 1534.
 Sir Thomas More's History of King Richard III (1513). More's book is hostile to Richard in a partisan spirit. A few years after Richard died a Warwickshire historian named John Rous claimed that Richard spent two years in the womb, and was finally born with a full set of teeth, and a full head of hair.  Thomas More described Richard  as "malicious, wrathful, envious …  little of stature, ill featured of limbs, crook back." More's source was John Morton, who was Archbishop of Canterbury under Henry VII, and had served as Bishop of Ely under Edward IV and Richard III. Other sources include various Tudor accounts, including those by John Rous and Polydore Vergil. More also provides direct testimony.

Further line of the tradition 
 Edward Hall's Union of the Noble and Illustre Families of Lancaster and York (1548), which was then in turn used as a reference by 
 Raphael Holinshed and his collaborators who wrote the Chronicles of England, Scotland and Wales (2nd edition, 1587), which was Shakespeare's primary source for his history plays.
 William Shakespeare's play, Richard III

See also
Ricardian (Richard III)

References 

Historiography
Propaganda in the United Kingdom
15th century in England
16th century in England